Willard Edwin "Fred" House (October 3, 1890 – November 16, 1923) was a Major League Baseball pitcher who played for the Detroit Tigers in .

He died in Kansas City, Missouri in 1923 of appendicitis.

References

External links

1890 births
1923 deaths
Detroit Tigers players
Major League Baseball pitchers
Baseball players from Missouri
Kewanee Boilermakers players
Deaths from appendicitis